Jaraikela railway station is a railway station on the South Eastern Railway network in the state of Odisha, India. It serves Jaraikela village. Its code is JRA. It has two platforms. Passenger, Express trains halt at Jaraikela railway station.

References

See also
 Sundergarh district

Railway stations in Sundergarh district
Chakradharpur railway division